Qarn Alam  is an airport serving the town of Qarn Alam in Oman.

See also
Transport in Oman
List of airports in Oman

References

External links
OurAirports - Oman
 Great Circle Mapper - Qarn Alam
OpenStreetMap - Qarn Alam
 Fallingrain - Qarn Alam

Airports in Oman